Tom Timusk (born 1933) is a Professor Emeritus of Physics at McMaster University in Hamilton, Ontario Canada. He is a retired member of the Condensed Matter research team at McMaster. He was an immigrant from Estonia displaced by Second World War. He settled in Hamilton, Ontario Canada.

Research
He started his research in spectroscopy and he is considered an experimental physicist. His original lab at McMaster was known as the Solid State Lab in the basement of the Senior Sciences Building. Recently he has had two labs and continues to complete active funded research. Timusk also researches superconductivity theory.

Education

Timusk graduated with a BA in physics from the University of Toronto. He obtained his PhD at Cornell University where his research was funded by a US Navy grant. He did his post-doctorate work in Frankfurt, Germany and at the University of Illinois, Urbana-Champaign. In 1965, he accepted a position at McMaster University where he has since been a professor.

Associations 
Professor Timusk is an active member of both the Canadian Association of Physicists and American Physics Society.   He was also inducted in the Royal Society of Canada in 1995.

Awards 
 2002 Frank Isakson Prize for Optical Effects in Solids (co-winner)
 2000 Canadian Association of Physicists' Brockhouse Medal

Papers

References 

Canadian physicists
1933 births
Living people
University of Toronto alumni
Fellows of the American Physical Society